Alotau Rural LLG is a local-level government (LLG) of Milne Bay Province, Papua New Guinea.

Wards
80. Alotau Town

References

Local-level governments of Milne Bay Province